Polygala multiflora is a plant species in the milkwort family (Polygalaceae). It is native to Western Africa. The flowers it produces are blue or purple. It was first written about was part of the Encyclopédie méthodique Botanique in 1804 by Jean Louis Marie Poiret.

References

multiflora